The Gran Enciclopèdia Catalana (in English: the Great Catalan Encyclopedia) is a Catalan-language encyclopedia, started in fascicles, and published in 1968 by . The soul of the work was written by Max Cahner, and the first director was Jordi Carbonell.

Overview
The encyclopedia collects alphabetical entries about different subjects: history, geography, cultural studies, etc. It includes worldwide views as well as, when appropriate, Catalan viewpoints and information (meaning that the work is very thorough and often written with first hand information).

GEC had a fixed team that wrote the content, and furthermore a broad set of partners, among which were the most prominent experts in each subject, which was involved in the preparation of the GEC with a great desire for service to the Catalan people.

Later editions have come out with several volumes and an appendix, as well as a digital edition. In 1991 it received the Cross of Saint George.

The Great Catalan Encyclopedia gained popularity and sold well, causing the encyclopedia to expand to include a broader series of historical, geographical, and lexical issues.

References

External links
 L'Enciclopèdia (free access)
 L'Enciclopèdia en línia (subscription needed)

Catalan language
Catalan-language encyclopedias
20th-century encyclopedias